The Council of India was the name given at different times to two separate bodies associated with British rule in India.

The original Council of India was established by the Charter Act of 1833 as a council of four formal advisors to the Governor-General at Fort William.  The Governor-General in Council was subordinate only to the East India Company's Court of Directors and to the British Crown.

In 1858 the Company's involvement in India's government was transferred by the Government of India Act 1858 to the  British government. The Act created a new governmental department in London (the India Office), headed by the cabinet-ranking Secretary of State for India, who was in turn to be advised by a new Council of India (also based in London).

But this new council of India, which assisted the Secretary of state for India contained 15 members while the erstwhile council of India contained 4 members only and was referred to as Council of four. After the establishment of the Council of 15, the Council of four  was formally renamed by the Act (s. 7) as the Council of the Governor General of India. Sometimes it was also called Executive Council of India.

Governor-General's council (1833-1858)
The 1773 Act provided for the election of four counsellors by the East India Company's Court of Directors. The Governor-General had a vote along with the counsellors, but he also had an additional casting vote. The decision of the Council was binding on the Governor-General.  The Council of Four, as it was known in its early days, did in fact attempt to impeach the first Governor-General, Warren Hastings, but in his subsequent trial by Parliament he was found to be not guilty.

In 1784, the Council was reduced to three members; the Governor-General continued to have both an ordinary vote and a casting vote. In 1786, the power of the Governor-General was increased even further, as Council decisions ceased to be binding.

The Charter Act 1833 made further changes to the structure of the Council. The Act was the first law to distinguish between the executive and legislative responsibilities of the Governor-General. As provided under the Act, there were to be four members of the Council elected by the Court of Directors. The first three members were permitted to participate on all occasions, but the fourth member was only allowed to sit and vote when legislation was being debated.

In 1858, the Court of Directors ceased to have the power to elect members of the Council. Instead, the one member who had a vote only on legislative questions came to be appointed by the Sovereign, and the other three members by the Secretary of State for India.

Secretary of State's Council
The Council of the Secretary of State, also known as the India Council was based in Whitehall. In 1907, two Indians Sir Krishna Govinda Gupta and Nawab Syed Hussain Bilgrami were appointed by Lord Morley as members of the council. Bilgrami retired early in 1910 owing to ill-health and his place was taken by Mirza Abbas Ali Baig. Other members included Raja Sir Daljit Singh (1915-1917), C. Rajagopalachari (1923-1925), Malik Khizar Hayat Tiwana (1924-1934) and Sir Abdul Qadir

The Secretary of State's Council of India was abolished by the Government of India Act 1935.

Members of the Council of India in London

See also

 India Office
 English Education Act 1835
 Central Legislative Assembly
 Viceroy's Executive Council
 Council of State (India)
 Imperial Legislative Council
 Interim Government of India

References

Further reading
 A Constitutional History of India, 1600–1935, by Arthur Berriedale Keith, published by Methuen & Co., London, 1936
 The Imperial Legislative Council of India from 1861 to 1920: A Study of the Inter-action of Constitutional Reform and National Movement with Special Reference to the Growth of Indian Legislature up to 1920, by Parmatma Sharan, published by S. Chand, 1961
 Imperialist Strategy and Moderate Politics: Indian Legislature at Work, 1909-1920, by Sneh Mahajan, published by Chanakya Publications, 1983

Government of British India